Peace are an English indie rock quartet, formed in Worcester. The band consists of brothers Harry (vocals, guitar) and Sam Koisser (bass), Doug Castle (guitar) and Dom Boyce (drums). The band began to receive critical acclaim in early 2012, from publications such as The Guardian and NME, who compared them to The Maccabees, Foals, Wu Lyf and Vampire Weekend. They were considered part of the B-Town movement, along with bands such as Swim Deep, Jaws and Superfood.

Their first single, "Follow Baby", was self-released in April 2012 in the form of 500 7" vinyl copies. The band then signed to Columbia Records & released their debut extended play, EP Delicious, on 7 September 2012. With their debut studio album, In Love, released on 25 March 2013, the band released their lead single "Wraith" on 13 January 2013. It was announced by the BBC on 9 December 2012 that Peace had been nominated for the Sound of 2013 poll.

The band is distinct from the zamrock band The Peace, that was active in the 1970s or the CCM band, Peace, led by Dan Peek during the 1990s.

History

2009–2011: Formation and beginnings
Originally named November and the Criminal, the band formed in August 2009 and released their self-titled debut EP in March 2010 before changing their name to Peace in October 2010. The band stated in 2013 they changed their name after having "written a whole different group of songs, which had a different feel" and dismissed their previous incarnation as November and The Criminal as being a "high-school band, when we were in college". During the band's last gig under their old name, they performed the first song written as Peace twice.

Lead singer Harry Koisser stated that the band was founded out of boredom, while the name Peace was inspired by a photograph celebrating the end of the Second World War. The Koisser brothers grew up in Droitwich, where they attended the Wychavon Youth Music after school club and formed Farmyard Juice before forming The Third Exit together in January 2004 whilst at Droitwich Spa High School. The brothers also formed Emo/Melodic hardcore band "Drowning In Deuce" in 2008. Boyce and Castle both attended Nunnery Wood High School, with the band forming when Harry Koisser and Boyce met at Worcester Sixth Form College.

Up until this point, the band were relatively unknown, even on the local music scene, and their earliest documented gig took place during the Worcester Music Festival on 23 August 2009 Andrew Marston of BBC Introducing was one of the band's first supporters, giving them a prime-time slot on the BBC Hereford & Worcester stage at the Nozstock Festival of Performing Arts in July 2010 as well as much airplay beforehand. Andy O'Hare would later make them one of his top ten picks of the year.

In January 2012, Peace released their first track, "Bblood", online. Having attracted the attention of NME, the band were featured as part of the magazine's 2012 'Ones to Watch' feature, which praised them for "Doomy, gruff vocals laced with foreboding guitars that board on tropical (and sound about 10 times more exhilarating than you imagine that could be)". Peace were also well received by The Guardian, who hailed them as "the future of indie".

The band released their debut single "Follow Baby" in April 2012, which was limited to 500 7" vinyl copies, 200 of which were signed by the band members. Having supported Mystery Jets and The Vaccines on tour, Peace proceeded to release their debut extended play EP Delicious on 7 September. Well received by the BBC and NME, the four-track extended play featured "California Daze", a track made available as a free download by the band in August of that year.

2012–2013: In Love
On 9 December 2012, the BBC announced that Peace had been nominated for the Sound of 2013 poll. The band released the lead single from their upcoming studio album "Wraith" on 13 January 2013, where it debuted at number seventy-five on the UK Singles Chart for the week ending 26 January 2013.

In February 2013, the band performed in an opening slot on the NME Awards Tour 2013 alongside Palma Violets, Miles Kane and headliners Django Django. "Follow Baby" was reissued as the second single from their debut album on 17 February 2013, failing to chart in the United Kingdom. In Love was released as the band's debut studio album on 25 March 2013 in the United Kingdom, debuting at number sixteen on the UK Albums Chart with sales of 9,028 copies for the chart week dated 6 April 2013.

Late 2013–2016: Happy People

In November 2013, Peace confirmed they had started recording for their second album. The band toured the US in October 2013 with Oliver Henry Burslem, who later formed and fronted Yak, temporarily replacing guitarist Douglas Castle. In late November and December 2013, playing at notable venues such as two nights at o2 Shepherd's Bush Empire, o2 Academy Birmingham, and Rock City (club) in Nottingham. During this November–December 2013 tour, Peace debuted future single 'Money'. The single received its first play on Hottest Record in the World on Radio 1 by Huw Stephens on 15 April 2014, with Peace announcing that it would be the first single from their upcoming second album and would be released 16 June 2014 and uploaded the music video for the song to their VEVO channel. The album date was scheduled for early February 2015.

On 30 July 2014, Peace announced the next single taken from their second album would be called "Lost On Me" and would be released on 28 September.

In August 2014, the band returned to the Reading and Leeds festivals, playing their largest shows to date. The band performed sixth on the bill for the main stage, playing before a number of popular artists including The Hives, Foster the People and the day's headliners Arctic Monkeys.

The second album, Happy People, was released on 9 February 2015.

2017–2020: Kindness is the New Rock and Roll
On 8 December 2017, the band issued their first release for new label Ignition Records in the form of digital single "From Under Liquid Glass". The track was released in support of MQ Mental Health.

Their third album, Kindness Is the New Rock and Roll, was released on 4 May 2018.

In 2022, their 2013 single "Lovesick" appeared in the first episode of the British TV series, Heartstopper.

Members
 Harrison "Harry" Koisser – Lead vocals, guitar, keyboards, piano, tambourine (2009–present)
 Douglas "Doug" Castle – Guitar (2009–present)
 Dominic "Dom" Boyce – Drums, percussion, backing vocals (2009–present)
 Samuel "Sam" Koisser – Bass, backing vocals (2009–present)

Discography

Studio albums

Extended plays

Singles

Tours
 Supertour (March–May 2012) (as headliner & support)
 Tour Delicious (October–December 2012) (as headliner)
 NME Awards Tour (February 2013) (as support)
 In Love Tour (April–May 2013) (as headliner)
 Gorge Tour (November–December 2013) (as headliner)
 May/June 2014 UK Tour
 So Long See You Tomorrow Tour (November–December 2014) (as support)
 J'adore tour 2015
 Happy People Tour 2015
 Kindness Is the New Rock and Roll Tour 2018

Awards and nominations

References

External links

 Peace on YouTube

Musical groups established in 2009
English indie rock groups
Musicians from Worcester, England
Ignition Records artists
Columbia Records artists